Tracy Gray  is a Canadian politician who was elected to represent the riding of Kelowna—Lake Country in the House of Commons of Canada in the 2019 Canadian federal election. Prior to her election in the House of Commons, she was a city councillor for Kelowna City Council.

Business career
Prior to entering public service, Gray had worked extensively in the British Columbia liquor industry. She served in senior managerial capacities at several breweries and wineries in the Okanagan Valley, including Mission Hill Winery and Granville Island Brewing. She ran the Retail and Hospitality department at Mission Hill when it was awarded the International Wine and Spirit Competition Avery Trophy for Best Chardonnay in the World.

In 2003, Gray launched a chain of VQA wine stores in the British Columbia Interior. Throughout its operation, the chain included the highest ranked wine store in British Columbia in terms of sales, and carried over 800 varieties of local British Columbia wine. Gray has guest lectured at the University of British Columbia Okanagan and Okanagan College about entrepreneurship and has been an advocate and mentor for women in business. Gray hosted a weekly wine lifestyle segment on Global Okanagan and has also served as a judge at several international wine competitions.

Gray was a director on the Okanagan Film Commission, an organization which promotes regional economic development in film and animation. She was also a board member for Prospera Credit Union. Gray was on the board when Prospera merged with Westminster Savings, the largest credit union merger in Canadian history, making the new organization the 6th largest credit union in Canada. She also served as a director on the Kelowna Chamber of Commerce.

Gray was appointed by British Columbia's cabinet to serve on the Passenger Transportation Board.

Politics

Kelowna City Councillor (2014-2018)
Gray was elected as a Kelowna City Councillor following the 2014 municipal election. While on City Council, Gray was also elected as Chair of the Okanagan Basin Water Board, and spearheaded the region's flood mitigation strategy and invasive Quagga mussel prevention campaign. In April 2017, the provincial government responded to the concerns raised by Gray and the Water Board about invasive mussels by hiring more conservation officers and providing funding for two more boat inspection stations in the area. She was also appointed as a Trustee on the Okanagan Regional Library board.

She also served at the regional government level as a director on the Central Okanagan Regional District board.

Federal Politics (2018-present)
On September 6, 2018, Gray announced she would seek the federal Conservative nomination for the electoral district of Kelowna—Lake Country, stating she felt compelled to run following the Liberal government's proposed small business tax changes. She won the contested nomination on April 6, 2019. Gray was elected as the Member of Parliament for the riding on October 21, defeating Liberal incumbent Stephen Fuhr. She is the first woman to be elected as a Member of Parliament for the riding.

Gray was named to the Official Opposition Shadow Cabinet in November 2019 as Shadow Minister for Interprovincial Trade. Following the election of Erin O'Toole as Conservative party leader, in September 2020 Gray became Shadow Minister for Export Promotion and International Trade. In her capacity as Shadow Minister for International Trade, Gray moved and passed a motion in the House of Commons to establish the Special Committee on the Economic Relationship between Canada and the United States, composed of members from recognized parties to study trade issues between the two countries.

She was re-elected for a second term in September 2021. Following the election, Gray was re-appointed to Shadow Cabinet in a new role as Shadow Minister for Small Business Recovery and Growth.

After the election of Pierre Poilievre as leader of the Conservative Party, Gray was given an updated role as the Shadow Minister for Employment, Future Workforce Development and Persons with Disabilities. She was also appointed vice-chair of the Committee on Human Resources, Skills and the Status of Persons with Disabilities.

Gray has advocated in Parliament for the federal government to do their part to complete the Okanagan Rail Trail, a multi-use path crossing the Okanagan region converting the former Okanagan Valley Railway. Presently, a 2 kilometer middle portion of the trail is incomplete while awaiting a federal government land transfer to the Okanagan Indian Band via an addition-to-reserve. Gray has written to the federal government and has asked numerous questions seeking updates on the completion of this addition-to-reserve process.

Gray voted against a bill that would prohibit compelling people to undergo conversion therapy intended to alter their sexual orientations. Gray supported an updated bill to ban conversion therapy in Canada which passed unanimously in Parliament, Bill C-4, stating that this revised legislation addressed her concerns from the previous iteration.

Abortion Rights Coalition of Canada has identified Gray as anti-abortion. Gray voted at second reading to send Bill C-233 - An Act to amend the Criminal Code (sex-selective abortion) to the committee stage for further study, which would make it an indictable offence for a medical practitioner to knowingly perform an abortion solely on the grounds of the child's genetic sex.

Gray successfully advocated for the full re-opening of the Kelowna International Airport to international flights in November 2021. Transborder flights at the airport were initially halted at the onset of the COVID-19 pandemic, with the resumption of these flights from Kelowna delayed by Transport Canada despite airports with lesser passenger volumes being returned their international designation earlier. She has also advocated for the expansion of passport services offered in the Okanagan, requesting the federal government allow Kelowna's passport office to provide urgent, same-day passport pick-up. Presently, individuals in BC's Interior must commute to either Surrey or Calgary for urgent passport requests.

In the 44th Parliament, Gray tabled Private Member's Bill C-283, the End the Revolving Door Act. This legislation seeks to create addiction treatment facilities in federal penitentiaries as a tool to reduce recidivism and address mental health and addictions issues for federal inmates. As a person who was adopted at birth, she has also tabled a Private Member's Motion M-46 to recognize November as 'National Adoption Awareness Month'.

Committee assignments

Current
Committee on Human Resources, Skills and the Status of Persons with Disabilities (Vice Chair)
Subcommittee on Agenda and Procedure of the Standing Committee on Human Resources

Previous
Committee on International Trade (Vice Chair) (September 2020 to September 2021)
Subcommittee on Agenda and Procedure of the Standing Committee on International Trade
Committee on Industry, Science and Technology (February 2020 to August 2020, October 2021 to October 2022)
Special Committee on the COVID-19 Pandemic (April 2020 to June 2020)

Source:

Personal life
Gray is married with one adult son. She was born in Edmonton and grew up in Lethbridge, moving to Kelowna in 1989. She is a graduate of the Haskayne School of Business at the University of Calgary.

In her free time, Gray enjoys skiing and used to sing in a volunteer community rock band composed of elected officials in the Kelowna-area.

Awards and recognition
In 2006, Gray was named RBC Canadian Woman Entrepreneur of the Year.

In 2008, she was named by the Women's Enterprise Centre as one of 100 'New Pioneers' in British Columbia involved in entrepreneurship.

In 2015, she was named as a 'Woman to Watch' by the Kelowna Chamber of Commerce and Kelowna Capital News for her work in the local wine industry and on city council.

Electoral record

Federal

Municipal

References

External links

Living people
Businesspeople from British Columbia
Businesspeople from Edmonton
Kelowna city councillors
Politicians from Edmonton
Conservative Party of Canada MPs
Members of the House of Commons of Canada from British Columbia
Women members of the House of Commons of Canada
Year of birth missing (living people)